Deborah Ross may refer to:

Deborah J. Ross (born 1947), American writer
Deborah K. Ross (born 1963), American politician from North Carolina
Deborah Ross (journalist), British journalist